Songs for the Wrong is the second and final studio album by the Dave Brockie Experience, released on July 15. 2003.

Track listing

Production
Recorded by Adam Green
Mixed by Grant Rutledge
Mastered by Gary Longest

References

External links
Songs for the Wrong on Metal Blade Records' website

2003 albums
Dave Brockie Experience albums
Metal Blade Records albums